The Rural Municipality of McCraney No. 282 is a rural municipality (RM) in the Canadian province of Saskatchewan within Census Division No. 11 and  Division No. 5. It is located in the south-central portion of the province.

History 
The RM of McCraney No. 282 incorporated as a rural municipality on December 13, 1909.

Geography 
Notable geographical features in the RM include the Allan Hills, Arm River, and Vanzance Lake.

Communities and localities 
The following urban municipalities are surrounded by the RM.

Villages
 Kenaston
 Bladworth

The following unincorporated communities are within the RM.

Localities
 Farrerdale
 Smales

Demographics 

Government 
The RM of McCraney No. 282 is governed by an elected municipal council and an appointed administrator that meets on the third Thursday of every month. The reeve of the RM is Murray Kadlec while its administrator is Jacklyn Zdunich. The RM's office is located in Kenaston.

See also 
List of rural municipalities in Saskatchewan
List of communities in Saskatchewan

References 

 
McCraney No. 282